German submarine U-2367 was a Type XXIII U-boat of Nazi Germany's Kriegsmarine during World War II. She was ordered on 20 September 1944, and was laid down on 11 December 1944 at Deutsche Werft AG, Hamburg, as yard number 521. She was launched on 23 February 1945 and commissioned under the command of Oberleutnant zur See Heinrich Schröder on 17 March 1945.

Design
Like all Type XXIII U-boats, U-2367 had a displacement of  when at the surface and  while submerged. The submarine was powered by one MWM six-cylinder RS134S diesel engine providing , one AEG GU4463-8 double-acting electric motor electric motor providing , and one BBC silent running CCR188 electric motor providing .

U-2367 was fitted with two  torpedo tubes in the bow. She could carry two preloaded torpedoes. The complement was 14 – 18 men. This class of U-boat did not carry a deck gun.

Service history
On 5 May 1945, U-2367 sunk near Schleimünde after a collision with another unidentified German U-boat.

Post war service
In August 1956, U-2367 was raised by the German Federal Navy and commissioned Hecht on 1 October 1957. On 30 September 1968, she was struck from the navy list and then broken up in Kiel in 1969.

See also
 Battle of the Atlantic

References

Bibliography

External links

U-boats commissioned in 1945
World War II submarines of Germany
1945 ships
Type XXIII submarines
Ships built in Hamburg
Maritime incidents in May 1945